SS Agios Georgios IV was a Greek-owned cargo steamship that was built in England in 1938 and sunk by a Japanese submarine in the Indian Ocean in 1942. Agios Georgios IV was one of a relatively small number of steamships that had White combination engines. This was a combination of a high-speed four-cylinder compound steam engine that drove the propeller shaft via single-reduction gearing, with an exhaust steam turbine that drove the same shaft via double-reduction gearing.

Building
In 1936 and 1937 Bartram & Sons in Sunderland built a set of six tramp steamships for Welsh shipowners, all to the same dimensions. All six ships had the same White's propulsion system, with a compound engine, an exhaust turbine, and reduction gearing for both engines. Llandaff, Nailsea Moor and Nailsea Manor were launched in 1937.

Bartram's then built Agios Nicolaos IV to the same design, as yard number 279. She was launched on 14 April 1938 and completed that July. The combined rating of her four-cylinder compound engine and exhaust steam turbine was 365 NHP.

NG Nicolaou owned Agios Nicolaos IV and G Nicolaou (Hellas) Ltd managed her. She was registered in Piraeus. Her wireless telegraph call sign was SVXM.

Loss
In the Second World War Greece was neutral until Italy tried to invade it in October 1940. In January 1941 Agios Georgios IV sailed from Piraeus to Port Said in Convoy AS 11, which comprised ten Greek, British, Dutch and Egyptian merchant ships. The convoy seems to have lacked an escort, but all ten ships arrived safely.

In June 1942 Agios Georgios IV was in passage between Aden and Table Bay. On 8 June, as she steamed through the Mozambique Channel,  sank her at position  with its 140 mm deck gun. The attack killed seven of Agios Georgios IVs crew: the Chief Officer, Second Officer, steward, two able seamen and two stokers.

References

Bibliography

1938 ships
Cargo ships of Greece
Maritime incidents in June 1942
Ships built on the River Wear
Ships sunk by Japanese submarines
Steamships of Greece
World War II merchant ships of Greece
World War II shipwrecks in the Indian Ocean